Richard Edgcumbe, 2nd Baron Edgcumbe PC (2 August 1716 – 10 May 1761) was a British nobleman and politician.

The eldest surviving son of Richard Edgcumbe, 1st Baron Edgcumbe and his wife Matilda Furnese, he was educated at Eton from 1725 to 1732. Through his father's interest in Devon and Cornwall, he was returned as Member of Parliament for Plympton Erle at a by-election in 1742 as a Government supporter.

Edgcumbe was a heavy gambler, losing "daily twenty guineas" at White's. He was given a secret service pension of £500 a year by Henry Pelham to provide for him. Meanwhile, he was made a capital burgess of Lostwithiel in 1743 and served as mayor the next year. He switched his seat to Lostwithiel in 1747. Dissatisfied with subsisting on Government charity, he unsuccessfully made an application to Pelham for employment, rather than a pension, in 1752. He was eventually made a Lord of Trade in 1754, when he was returned for Penryn and the next year, a Lord of the Admiralty instead, serving for a year. In 1756, he was appointed Comptroller of the Household and was again mayor of Lostwithiel, being appointed to the Privy Council on 19 November. Succeeding his father in 1758, he was appointed Lord Lieutenant of Cornwall in 1759 and recorder of Plympton Erle. He died childless in 1761 and was succeeded by his brother.

References 

1716 births
1761 deaths
Barons Edgcumbe
British MPs 1741–1747
British MPs 1747–1754
British MPs 1754–1761
Lord-Lieutenants of Cornwall
Lords of the Admiralty
Members of the Parliament of Great Britain for Plympton Erle
Whig (British political party) MPs
Members of the Parliament of Great Britain for constituencies in Cornwall
People educated at Eton College